John Laskowski (born June 7, 1953) is an American former professional basketball player. He played two seasons in the National Basketball Association (NBA).

College career 
A 6'6" guard born in South Bend, Indiana, Laskowski played basketball for Bob Knight and the Indiana University Hoosiers from 1971 to 1975.  He averaged 10.8 points per game and 3.8 rebounds per game in three seasons as his team's sixth man, earning him the nickname "Super-Sub." He came off the bench to score in the 20s six times and in double figures 40 times.

In his sophomore year, 1972–73, Indiana reached the Final Four losing to UCLA. His senior season, the 1974-75 season, the Hoosiers went undefeated the entire regular season and swept the entire Big Ten by an average of 22.8 points per game. However, in an 83-82 win against Purdue they lost consensus All-American forward Scott May to a broken left arm. With May's injury keeping him to 7 minutes of play, the No. 1 Hoosiers lost to Kentucky 92-90 in the Mideast Regional.

Professional basketball career 
In 1975 he was selected by the Chicago Bulls in the second round of the National Basketball Association Draft and by the Kentucky Colonels in the fourth round of the 1975 ABA Draft.  He played two seasons with the Bulls, averaging 7.1 points and 2.4 rebounds.

Later life 
Since retiring as a player, Laskowski has worked as a television color commentator and play-by-play analyst for Indiana University basketball games for the Big Ten Network. He also authored the 2003 book Tales from the Hoosier Locker Room.  He was inducted into the Indiana Basketball Hall of Fame in 1999. In 2018, he opened a Culver's restaurant in Bloomington, Indiana.

Notes

1953 births
Living people
American men's basketball players
Basketball players from South Bend, Indiana
Chicago Bulls draft picks
Chicago Bulls players
Indiana Hoosiers men's basketball players
Kentucky Colonels draft picks
Shooting guards